Mariano Idelman (born 27 June 1974, Argentina) is an Israeli actor and comedian. He is well known for acting in the popular TV show Eretz Nehederet.

Career
In 1996 he appeared in Dudu Topaz's stand-up comedy show called The First in Entertainment with Eli Finish, and signed a 2-year contract with the show.

Idelman and Finish continued working together with a stand-up act called Ovrim Al HaTzhok (a word play on Ovrim Al HaHok, Hebrew for "breaking the law"), and in 2001 created their own show named Ahla Seret ("A Great Movie"). In 2002 they released a 'best moments' DVD. In the same year, they appeared in a show on Bip called Lo Nafsik Litzhok ("(We) Won't Stop Laughing") along with Tal Friedman, Asi Cohen and Rotem Abuhav. The first two continued with Idelman and Finish to Eretz Nehederet in 2003.

"Eretz Nehederet"
Idelman began his career starring in "Eretz Nehederet" in 2003, along with Eli Finish, Tal Friedman, Asi Cohen, Orna Banai, Eyal Kitzis, and others. He has parodied numerous national-level political figures, including Shimon Peres, Moshe Katzav and Amir Peretz, and more recently, former Israeli Prime Minister Benjamin Netanyahu.

"Arab Labor"
Idelman was a regular character in the multi-season Israeli TV situation-comedy series "Arab Labor" (Arabic: شغل عرب ; Hebrew: עבודה ערבית) produced by Keshet Broadcasting in 2007, 2008 and 2012. He plays the perennially lovesick Meir, a Jewish-Israeli photojournalist and friend to the main character of the show.

External links

1974 births
Israeli Jews
Israeli male comedians
Israeli male television actors
Living people
Israeli entertainers
Argentine emigrants to Israel
Israeli people of Argentine-Jewish descent